Gondek may refer to:

People with the surname
Jyoti Gondek (born 1969), Canadian politician
Kacper Gondek (1993–2018), Polish canoeist
Leszek Gondek (1939–2013), Polish lawyer, historian and writer
Waldemar Gondek (born 1953), Polish middle-distance runner

Places
Gondek-e Hasan, Iran
Gondek-e Isa, Iran
Gondek-e Seh, Iran

See also

Kondek
Kondak (disambiguation)